Jesus "José" Becerra (15 April 1936 – 6 August 2016) was a Mexican professional boxer. He became world champion in the bantamweight division.

Becerra was born in Guadalajara, Jalisco, Mexico, the youngest of the five children. His parents were Maria Covarrubias and Jesus Becerra. At age 12, in the 5th grade, Becerra quit school to work in a carriage repair shop.

Professional career
Becerra received his first public notice in the Mexican sports world by scoring an upset over the vastly more experienced Manuel Armenteros. After some ups and downs, Becerra earned a top 10 ranking by knocking out former world champion Mario D'Agata. A short time later, Becerra won the Lineal bantamweight championship with a knockout over Alphonse Halimi.

After two successful title defenses, Becerra lost a stunning upset, being knocked out by club-fighter Eloy Sanchez in a non-title fight. Becerra was so dejected by the defeat that he announced his retirement at age 24.

In 1962, Mexican club fighter, Rudy Coronado was seriously injured in a fight. On a special benefit show for Coronado and his family, Becerra returned to the ring and won a 6-round decision over Alberto Martinez. Becerra donated his fight-purse to the injured boxer's family. Becerra never fought again.

Exhibition Tour

As world champion, Becerra went on a successful exhibition tour which drew big crowds. The tour was as follows:

1959: Sept. 1-Sandy Garcia, Fresno, CA......Exch. 4 rounds
1959: Date ?-Joe Vargas, Stockton, CA.......Exch. TKO 3 rounds
1959: Sept.8- Willie Sanchez, San Jose, CA..Exch. 2 rounds
1959: Sept.8-Cy Ruiz, San Jose, CA,.........Exch. 2 rounds
1959: Sept.9-Eduardo Santos, El Paso, TX....Exch. 4 rounds
1959: Sept.?-Jessie Leija, San Antonio, TX..Exch. 4 rounds
1959: Sept.14-Henry Miramontes, Dallas, TX..Exch. 4 rounds

See also
List of world bantamweight boxing champions
List of Mexican boxing world champions

References

External links
Dan Cuoco Bio Article

José Becerra - CBZ Profile

1936 births
Bantamweight boxers
Boxers from Jalisco
2016 deaths
Mexican male boxers
Sportspeople from Guadalajara, Jalisco
20th-century Mexican people